Sulistyo Wibowo (born 17 February 1969) is an Indonesian former professional tennis player.

Biography
Born in Tegal, Wibowo is the brother of Fed Cup player Liza Andriyani.

Wibowo featured in 11 Davis Cup ties for Indonesia between 1996 and 2001. Playing as a doubles specialist, he won six Davis Cup rubbers, all partnering Bonit Wiryawan. He represented Indonesia with success at the Southeast Asian Games, where he won two gold medals in doubles and another two in the team event. His best performance at the Asian Games was a doubles quarter-final appearance at the 1998 event in Bangkok.

While competing on the professional tour, Wibowo made two ATP Tour doubles quarter-finals, both at the Indonesia Open, including the 1995 tournament when he partnered Mahesh Bhupathi. At the 1996 Indonesia Open he played in the main draw of the singles as a wildcard and lost in the first round to Austrian qualifier Herbert Wiltschnig in three sets.

See also
List of Indonesia Davis Cup team representatives

References

External links
 
 
 

1969 births
Living people
Indonesian male tennis players
Sportspeople from Central Java
People from Tegal
Universiade medalists in tennis
Universiade bronze medalists for Indonesia
Medalists at the 1991 Summer Universiade
Southeast Asian Games medalists in tennis
Southeast Asian Games gold medalists for Indonesia
Southeast Asian Games silver medalists for Indonesia
Southeast Asian Games bronze medalists for Indonesia
Competitors at the 1995 Southeast Asian Games
Competitors at the 1997 Southeast Asian Games
Competitors at the 2001 Southeast Asian Games
Tennis players at the 1998 Asian Games
Asian Games competitors for Indonesia